30 Years of Adventure:  A Celebration of Dungeons & Dragons is a 2004 publisher's retrospective written by Harold Johnson, Steve Winter, Peter Adkison, Ed Stark, and Peter Archer.   It is an illustrated,  behind-the-scenes history of the Dungeons & Dragons (D&D) fantasy tabletop role-playing game, issued by the game's publisher (Wizards of the Coast) to commemorate the game's 30th anniversary.

Overview 

30 Years of Adventure presents D&Ds history in mostly-chronological order, beginning with the creation of the game by Gary Gygax and Dave Arneson, and ending with the Hasbro's acquisition of Wizards of the Coast.  It includes chapters devoted to the development history of  various D&D campaign settings such as the World of Greyhawk, Dragonlance, and the Forgotten Realms. In keeping with its historical theme, nearly all of the book's artwork is taken from D&D products of the era.

30 Years of Adventure also features short essays by a variety of celebrities (including comedian Stephen Colbert, actor Wil Wheaton, and animator Genndy Tartakovsky), describing their experiences with Dungeons & Dragons.  The book's foreword is by actor Vin Diesel.

Editions 

2004, United States, Wizards of the Coast, pub date 1 Sep 2004, Hardback
2006, United States, Wizards of the Coast, pub date 7 Feb 2006, Paperback

Further reading
Drake, Matt (2004). Review of 30 Years of Adventure: A Celebration of Dungeons & Dragons, retrieved June 20, 2006.
Fiegel, Michael (2004). 30 Years of Adventure: A Celebration of D&D (review), retrieved June 20, 2006.
Spencer, Kenneth A (2015). The Polychronicon - A thirty-five year adventure. A day by day account of six players who played Dungeons and Dragons together from August 1980, and still continue to play, in the same self-consistent world. Created July 2015.

2004 non-fiction books
Books about role-playing games
Dungeons & Dragons books
Popular culture books